Marlon Darryl Forbes (born December 25, 1971) is a former professional American football cornerback in the National Football League. Before playing in the NFL, he was a member of the Penn State football team. He played four seasons for the Chicago Bears (1996–1998) and the Cleveland Browns (1999).

1971 births
Living people
Sportspeople from Brooklyn
Players of American football from New York City
American football cornerbacks
Penn State Nittany Lions football players
Chicago Bears players
Cleveland Browns players